FC Brossard was a Canadian semi-professional soccer club based in Brossard, Quebec that played for two seasons in the Première Ligue de soccer du Québec.

History
The club was originally formed in 1978 as a youth soccer club.

In 2012, the semi-professional club was established to play in the newly formed Première Ligue de soccer du Québec, a Division III league, as one of the founding members. Their home field was located at Parc Illinois. Former Montreal Impact player Bill Sedgewick was named as the team's head coach. Cédric Carrié won the Ballon d’Or in the 2012 season as the league's top player. In 2013, they advanced to the finals of the League Cup, losing to CS Mont-Royal Outremont 2-0. The club did not return for the 2014 PLSQ season, due to the high financial costs associated with operating a team.

In 2021, they joined CF Montreal's Scouting and Development Centre.

Seasons

Notable former players
The following players have either played at the professional or international level, either before or after playing for the PLSQ team:

References

Soccer clubs in Quebec
Brossard
Association football clubs established in 1978
1978 establishments in Quebec
Brossard